Artistry is a brand of skin care and cosmetic products, owned by Amway headquartered in Ada, Michigan, and sold through Amway Business Owners in more than 50 countries and territories worldwide.

Background
Edith Rehnborg, wife of Nutrilite founder Carl Rehnborg, founded Edith Rehnborg Cosmetics in 1968, which later became Artistry. In 1972, Nutrilite merged with Amway thereby giving Amway the controlling interest of the Artistry brand. The brand expanded internationally to Australia, Hong Kong, Malaysia, France, the Netherlands, United Kingdom and West Germany.

In 1980, Artistry products were manufactured at Nutrilite in California and by 1995 they were also produced at the Amway China facility. Over the years, Artistry expanded their product portfolio. As of 2000, the Artistry range included over 400 products.

Partnerships
In May 2007, Artistry Cosmetics were the official skin care and cosmetics sponsor for Skate Canada events and the Skate Canada national team. In 2008, the brand partnered with actress Sandra Bullock as the face of Artistry Creme LuXury. In 2010, Artistry and Amway were the sponsors of the Miss America competition. The brand has also partnered with events including the Oscars,  New York Fashion Week, Busan International Film Festival, and individuals namely Teresa Palmer and Rick DiCecca.

Awards and recognition
The Artistry Essentials skincare line won AmeriStar's 2007 Package Competition in the category of Health & Beauty Aids Artistry Créme Luxury (also known Créme L/X) won the Skin Care Prestige category in the International Package Design Awards (IPDA) in 2008 and was nominated as a finalist in the Best New Skincare Product of the Year category for the 2009 UK Beauty Awards.

References 

Amway brands
1950s establishments in the United States